The Canton of Thann is a French former administrative division, located in the département of Haut-Rhin and the region Alsace. It had 20,403 inhabitants (2012). It was disbanded following the French canton reorganisation which came into effect in March 2015.

The canton comprised the following communes:

Aspach-le-Haut
Bitschwiller-lès-Thann
Bourbach-le-Bas
Guewenheim
Leimbach
Michelbach
Rammersmatt
Roderen
Thann (seat)
Vieux-Thann
Willer-sur-Thur

References

Thann
2015 disestablishments in France
States and territories disestablished in 2015